The Nur-Sultan Challenger is a professional tennis tournament played on indoor hardcourts. It is currently part of the ATP Challenger Tour and the ITF Women's World Tennis Tour, and held annually in Nur-Sultan, Kazakhstan since 2019.

Past finals

Men's singles

Women's singles

Men's doubles

Women's doubles

References

ATP Challenger Tour
ITF Women's World Tennis Tour
Hard court tennis tournaments
Tennis tournaments in Kazakhstan
Astana
Recurring sporting events established in 2019